Special Envoy  (1980 – 2010) was an Irish Sport Horse ridden by Rodrigo Pessoa. He won many top international competitions in the sport of show jumping. He stood 16.3 hh (170 cm).

Special Envoy was first jumped with success as a novice in Ireland by Marion Hughes, who is also related to his breeder. He was then  sold by Marion's father Seamus Hughes to Nelson Pessoa. Nelson had a lot of success on him before passing the ride to his son Rodrigo.

Major achievements
 1991 FEI World Cup Final, Göteborg - 2nd with Nelson Pessoa to Milton and John Whitaker - (winner of the second leg)
 1992 Olympic Games, Barcelona - 9th with Rodrigo Pessoa 
 1994 World Equestrian Games, The Hague - 4th team Brazil and 8th individual with Rodrigo Pessoa 
1995 Pan American Games, Mar del Plata - team Gold medal
 1996 FEI World Cup Final, Geneva - 4th

International wins

 1989 Dublin Grand Prix
 1990 Nice Grand Prix  
 1990 Donaueschinger Grand Prix  
 1991 Zuidlaren Grand Prix
 1991 Aachen Nations Cup - double clear
 1991 Padenborn Grand Prix
 1992 Malenes Grand Prix
 1992 International Championship Germany
 1993 Wiesbaden Grand Prix
 1993 Paris Grand Prix
 1993 Eindhoven Derby
 1994 Aachen Grand Prix
 1994 Aarhus Grand Prix
 1996 Dortmund Grand Prix

References

External links
 Photo of Special Envoy
 Special Envoy's pedigree

1980 animal births
2010 animal deaths
Show jumping horses
Individual male horses
Horses in the Olympics
